Cali's Fair (Dec. 25 - 30) is the most important cultural event in Cali, Colombia.  It is a celebration of the region's cultural identity, famous for the Salsa marathon, horse riding parades and dance parties.

Called "La Feria de Cali" (The Fair of Cali). The Fair has been celebrated since 1957, from December 25 to December 30, and it promotes cultural, ethnical, and musical diversity in the region. Tourism around The Fair is a main driver of the city's economy during the end of the year.

In a few occasions The Fair included Vallenato and Merengue groups from Colombian and surrounding Caribbean countries, and samba schools from Rio de Janeiro, Brazil. Also, the Fair is known as the " (sugar cane fair) and "Feria de la salsa" (Salsa music fair). People enjoy many activities like an opening cabalgata (parade of horseback riders), tascas (international food street), salsa concerts, bullfights (which are under a legal dispute), parades, athletic activities/competitions and cultural exhibitions.

From an international stand point Cali is also known as the "Capital de la Salsa" given the city's infatuation with that type of Afro-Caribbean music. In early July there is also the Summer Salsa Festival which lasts for one week. It usually includes concerts by the world's great remaining salsa bands as well as dance shows and "melomano" competitions in which salsa connoisseurs try to out do each other by digging deep into the archives of salsa music and related sounds to find and reveal long lost tunes.

References

External links
 Official website

Colombian culture
Society of Colombia
Fairs in Colombia
Parades in Colombia